The 14th National Spelling Bee was held at the National Museum in Washington, D.C. on May 31, 1938. Scripps-Howard would not sponsor the Bee until 1941.

The winner was 12-year-old Marian Richardson, who attended a one-room schoolhouse in Floyd County, Indiana, correctly spelling the word sanitarium. Jean Pierce of Kenmore, New York placed second after failing to correctly spell pronunciation.

Winner Marian Richardson, later Byrnes, became an environmental activist in Chicago, and died on May 20, 2010.

References

Scripps National Spelling Bee competitions
1938 in education
1938 in Washington, D.C.
May 1938 events